The Arrogant Worms are a Canadian musical comedy trio founded in 1991 that parodies many musical genres. They are well known for their humorous on-stage banter in addition to their music. The members since 1995 are Trevor Strong (vocals), Mike McCormick (guitar, vocals), and Chris Patterson (bass, vocals).

History
The Arrogant Worms came together in 1991 to do a few spots on campus radio station CFRC at Queen's University at Kingston, and quickly moved to doing spots on CBC Radio, particularly on Jack Farr's The Radio Show. Founding members were Strong, McCormick, John Whytock, and Steve Wood. Wood left the band in 1991, and Whytock left in 1995. He was replaced by Patterson.

The Worms have toured Canada, the United States, the United Kingdom, and Australia, playing to crowds as large as 100,000. They have played at celebrations on Parliament Hill in Ottawa, and at a concert in New York, United States's Central Park.

Since 1992 the Worms have released twenty-one albums, mostly independently, with sales exceeding 175,000. Their songs pay homage, always humorously, to different genres and topics. In 2003, they released a CD and DVD that was recorded live with the Edmonton Symphony Orchestra. Some of their albums include contributions from prominent musicians, including Andy Thompson, Andrew Affleck, Gord Thompson, Adrian Dolan, Mike Ford, John Loughrey, Terry Tufts and Tim Readman, who is also their dialect coach.

Rock, folk, ballads, country, and children's music all have been genres parodied by the Worms. When not spoofing a particular style of music, the Worms' material pokes fun at various aspects of daily life in Canada with songs like "Canada's Really Big", "Me Like Hockey", "We are the Beaver", "I Am Not American", and "Proud to Be Canadian".

They have also recorded music videos for three songs: "Big Fat Road Manager", "Carrot Juice Is Murder", and "The River (River of Snot)". The first two of these are included on the Three Worms and an Orchestra DVD, which includes appearances by Tom Cavanagh, Nathan Fillion and Kurt Browning.

The band has long supported the cause of literacy in Canada, and have twice won the Peter Gzowski Award for their efforts.

Discography

Studio albums
 The Arrogant Worms (1992), Independent
 Russell's Shorts (1994), Festival Distribution
 C'est Cheese (1995), Festival Distribution
 Christmas Turkey (1998), Festival Distribution
 Dirt! (1999), Independent
 Idiot Road (2001), Independent
 Beige (2006), Independent
 SPACE (2014), Independent
 The First Farewell Album (2016), Independent
 Fan Funded Songs 2017 (2017), Independent
 Fan Funded Songs 2018 (2018), Independent
 Fan Funded Songs 2019 (2019), Independent
 Fan Funded Songs 2020 (2020), Independent
 Fan Funded Songs 2021 (2021), Independent

Live albums
 Live Bait (1997), Independent
 Semi-Conducted (live with the Edmonton Symphony Orchestra) (2003), Independent
 Toast! (2004), Independent
 Torpid (2008), Independent

Compilations
 Gift Wrapped (2002), Oglio Records
 Hindsight 20/20 (2013), Independent
 Completely Canadian Compilation (2015)

Videos
 Three Worms and an Orchestra (DVD of Semi-Conducted performances and other original music videos) (2004)

References

External links
 Official website
 Biography
 Discography

Canadian comedy musical groups
Musical groups from Kingston, Ontario
Musical groups established in 1991
1991 establishments in Ontario
Nerd-folk musicians